Rispoli is a surname. Notable persons with that surname include:

 Andrea Rispoli (born 1988), Italian footballer
 Giovanni Rispoli (1836–?), Italian engraver
 James Rispoli, former Assistant Secretary of Energy for Environmental Management
 James Rispoli (motorcyclist) (born 1991), American motorcycle racer
 John Matthew Rispoli (1582–1639), Maltese philosopher
 Luciano Rispoli (1932–2016), Italian journalist
 Michael Rispoli (born 1960), American actor
 Salvatore Rispoli (1739–1812), Italian opera composer
 Umberto Rispoli, Italian horse racing jockey